Tang Jinhua (born 8 January 1992) is a Chinese retired badminton player who competed at the highest level during the second decade of the 2000s, winning numerous women's doubles and occasional mixed doubles events with a variety of partners. She is a graduate of Hunan University.

Career 

In 2009 Tang Jianhua won the World Junior girls double title with partner Xia Huan  in Alor Setar, Malaysia. A year later in Guadalajara, Mexico they nearly repeated this success but fell in the finals to compatriots Bao Yixin and Ou Dongni. Tang and Xia also won girls' doubles at both the 2009 and 2010 Asian Junior Championships before graduating into elite level women's competition. In October 2010, the young partnership reached the final of the Vietnam Open Grand Prix and in December they won their first Grand Prix level title at the India Grand Prix where Tang also copped the mixed doubles title with partner Liu Peixuan.

In September 2011, Tang and Xia won their first Super Series title at the China Masters, one of a BWF tour of tournaments rated behind only the World Championships and the Olympic Games in prestige. In 2011 they also reached the semi-finals of the Grand Prix Gold level  Korea Open and the finals of the Super Series Premier level China Open.

In 2012, Tang Jinhua and Xia Huan won the Grand Prix Gold level German Open and Swiss Open. At the prestigious Super Series Premier All England Championships they advanced to the semifinals before falling to compatriots Wang Xiaoli and Yu Yang. In June Tang  and Xia were disappointed at the Thailand Open when, as tops seeds, they were upset in the semifinals by a scratch Thai pairing (who would win the event) but Tang Jinhua rebounded from this loss by winning mixed doubles at the same tournament, and from an unseeded position, with partner Tao Jiaming. In October Tang formed a new partnership with the already highly accomplished Ma Jin and they won back to back women's doubles titles at the Denmark Open Super Series Premier and the French Open Super Series.

Tang Jinhua's most successful years were 2013 and 2014.  2013 brought her solid if not spectacular results with Ma Jin as they finished second to Chinese compatriots at the Super Series Premier Korea Open, the China Masters Super Series, and the Badminton Asia Championships, and to a Korean pairing at the  German Open, before claiming victory at the Yonex Open Japan Super Series in September. At the end of 2013, Tang and Ma somewhat surprisingly lost the final of the Super Series Masters Finals to the Danish pair of Christinna Pedersen and Kamilla Rytter Juhl. Tang's results with Ma Jin, however, were completely overshadowed by her success with new partner Bao Yixin beginning in October 2013. In rapid succession the two 21-year-olds claimed titles at the Dutch Open Grand Prix, the Denmark Super Series Premier, the French Super Series, the Hong Kong Super Series and the Macao Open Grand Prix Gold, all before the end of the year. Of the first 28 matches they played the new pairing lost only once. In first four months 2014, Tang Jinhua & Bao Yixin won the Korea Open Super Series, the Malaysia Super Series Premier, the Swiss Open Grand Prix Gold and the Singapore Super Series. Tang Jinhua was also part of the Chinese Uber Cup winning team in 2014. Together with Women's Doubles partner Bao Yixin she reached the number one spot of the BWF World Ranking on 29 May 2014.

In 2015, she won the China Masters Grand Prix Gold tournament with Zhong Qianxin. For the Superseries tournament, She won the Indonesia Open with Tian Qing, and French Open with Huang Yaqiong. In 2016, she and Huang won the German Open Grand Prix Gold tournament, beat the Thai pairs Puttita Supajirakul and Sapsiree Taerattanachai.

In May 2019, she announced her retirement on her Weibo.

Achievements

Asian Championships 
Women's doubles

BWF World Junior Championships 
Girls' doubles

Asian Junior Championships 
Girls' doubles

BWF World Tour 
The BWF World Tour, which was announced on 19 March 2017 and implemented in 2018, is a series of elite badminton tournaments sanctioned by the Badminton World Federation (BWF). The BWF World Tours are divided into levels of World Tour Finals, Super 1000, Super 750, Super 500, Super 300 (part of the HSBC World Tour), and the BWF Tour Super 100.

Women's doubles

BWF Superseries 
The BWF Superseries, which was launched on 14 December 2006 and implemented in 2007, is a series of elite badminton tournaments, sanctioned by the Badminton World Federation (BWF). BWF Superseries levels are Superseries and Superseries Premier. A season of Superseries consists of twelve tournaments around the world that have been introduced since 2011. Successful players are invited to the Superseries Finals, which are held at the end of each year.

Women's doubles

Mixed doubles

  BWF Superseries Finals tournament
  BWF Superseries Premier tournament
  BWF Superseries tournament

BWF Grand Prix 

The BWF Grand Prix had two levels, the BWF Grand Prix and Grand Prix Gold. It was a series of badminton tournaments sanctioned by the Badminton World Federation (BWF) which was held from 2007 to 2017.

Women's doubles

Mixed doubles

  BWF Grand Prix Gold tournament
  BWF Grand Prix tournament

References

External links 

 

1992 births
Living people
Sportspeople from Nanjing
Badminton players from Jiangsu
Chinese female badminton players
Badminton players at the 2018 Asian Games
Asian Games silver medalists for China
Asian Games medalists in badminton
Medalists at the 2018 Asian Games
World No. 1 badminton players